President or Presidente Perón may refer to:

 Presidente Perón Partido, a partido located in Argentina
 Juan Perón (1895–1974)